The Independents are a horror-punk/ska band from Myrtle Beach and Florence, South Carolina.

Biography
The Independents are an American horror-punk/ska band formed in Florence, South Carolina in 1992 by Evil Presly and Willy B. Their first recording was a four-song demo recorded in 1992 at the Jam Room in Columbia, South Carolina which they duplicated onto approximately 260 cassettes using a home stereo. Evil personally sold these while tour managing the SC band 49 Reasons during their first US Tour. In October 1995, they released their debut album In for the Kill on Rockduster Records.

From their beginning, the band was championed by Joey Ramone of the Ramones. In 1998, Joey served as executive producer on their EP Unholy Living Dead. That year, they also played dates on the Warped Tour. Joey would manage the band until his death in 2001. The band's 2001 album, Back from the Grave, was produced by Joey and Ramones producer Daniel Rey.

In 2004, the band was involved in a van crash while touring England with The Dangerfields. Willy B broke his arm in several places and the remaining dates were cancelled, but they returned in 2007 for a full European tour.

The Independents released the album Do It Again in 2008. Leading up to the album's release, they toured with The Queers, as well as headlining their own tours. They have also played select shows in the US with bands The Misfits, Flogging Molly, Blink 182, Cheap Trick and Mustard Plug. The Independents have also toured with the Voodoo Glow Skulls on many occasions.

In 2014 The Independents released their CD "Into The Light", their first full-length CD since 2008's "Do it Again". Although they had no official releases between the years of 2008–2014 with the exception of the "Ho Ho Ho...What A Party" Demos (2013), the band were on the road performing shows all over the United States and Canada. Late in 2014 The Independents released a limited edition live CD titled "Live In Kansas City 10/30/2014" as a merchandise package deal. The CD also contained the "Ho Ho Ho...What a Party" Demos. In late 2014 they released a split 7-inch with POTBELLY from Whidbey Island WA on Snatchee Records.

Discography

Studio albums

EPs

References

External links
Official site

Musical groups from South Carolina
American ska musical groups
Hellcat Records artists
Horror punk groups